The 2014–15 season was the tenth season of the current professional domestic soccer competition in Australia.

The season also included the inaugural FFA Cup, with the matches from the Round of 32 onwards taking place between July and December.

The domestic season scheduling was altered to avoid clashing with the 2015 AFC Asian Cup.

Domestic leagues

A-League

The 2014–15 A-League regular season began on 10 October 2014 and ended on 26 April 2015.

W-League

The 2014–15 W-League regular season began on 13 September 2014 and ended on 7 December 2014.

National Premier Leagues

The 2014 National Premier Leagues regular season in the states' leagues ran from 21 February 2014 until 14 September 2014 and the states' finals series ran from 23 August 2014 until 14 September 2014.

The National Finals Series began on 20 September 2014 and ended with the Grand Final on 4 October 2014. The winner of the Grand Final was North Eastern MetroStars who qualified for the 2015 FFA Cup round of 32.

National Youth League

The National Youth League season 2014–15 ran from 14 October 2014 to 1 March 2015.

Domestic cups

FFA Cup

The 2014 FFA Cup began on 29 July and ended on 16 December. This was the inaugural staging of the competition.

International club competitions

FIFA Club World Cup

Western Sydney Wanderers qualified for the 2014 FIFA Club World Cup as winners of the 2014 AFC Champions League.

AFC Champions League

International Women's Club Championship

The W-League was represented in the third edition of the International Women's Club Championship, known for sponsorship reasons as the Nestlé Cup.

Melbourne Victory (the winners of the 2013–14 season) participated in the tournament, which took place from 30 November until 8 December 2013, and finished in sixth place (out of 6 teams).

National teams

Men's senior

Australia played five friendlies ahead of the AFC Asian Cup. They recorded their 5th consecutive loss against Belgium at Stade Maurice Dufrasne in Liège but snapped the losing streak with their second win in the Ange Postecoglou era against Saudi Arabia at Craven Cottage in London. The Socceroos didn't succeed in their friendlies in the Persian Gulf, as they were held to a goalless draw against the United Arab Emirates on a hot and humid evening at Mohammed Bin Zayed Stadium in Abu Dhabi and 4 days later lost to Qatar at Abdullah bin Khalifa Stadium in Doha in their 500th international match. In their last friendly before the AFC Asian Cup, Australia lost to Japan at Nagai Stadium in Osaka, despite dominating the hosts in the first half.

Two months after being crowned champions of Asia, Australia played a pair of friendlies in Europe. In the first match they were close to upsetting world champions Germany at Fritz-Walter-Stadion in Kaiserslautern, but finished the match as a draw. In the following week they drew against Macedonia at Philip II Arena in Skopje, despite easily being the better side.

Friendlies

AFC Asian Cup

The 2015 AFC Asian Cup was played in Australia in January 2015. Australia were crowned champions for the first time after beating South Korea in extra time in the final.

FIFA World Cup qualification

Men's under 23

Friendlies

AFC U-23 Championship qualification

Men's under 20

Friendlies

AFF U-19 Youth Championship

AFC U-19 Championship

Men's under 17

Friendlies

AFC U-16 Championship

Women's senior

Friendlies

Cyprus Cup

FIFA Women's World Cup

Australia qualified for the 2015 FIFA Women's World Cup by finishing in the top four of the 2014 AFC Women's Asian Cup.

Women's under 20

AFC U-19 Women's Championship qualification

AFF Women's Championship

Women's under 17

AFC U-16 Women's Championship qualification

References

External links
 Football Federation Australia official website

 
 
2014–15 in Australian women's soccer
Seasons in Australian soccer